David Stypka (21 July 1979 – 10 January 2021) was a Czech singer known for his performances in the band David Stypka and Bandjeez.

Biography
Stypka came from Dobrá near Frýdek-Místek. After graduating from a grammar school in Frýdek, he was a journalist in the regional press, and also briefly worked at a candle shop and was a salesman at local festivals. After years of journalistic work, he became a graphic artist and typesetter. He had long collaborated with the magazine  (single-parentship). He was single, with three children. 

In the summer of 2019, Stypka was diagnosed with pancreatic cancer. He died on 10 January 2021, at the age of 41 from complications associated with COVID-19 during the COVID-19 pandemic in the Czech Republic.

References

External links
 
 

1979 births
2021 deaths
Czech journalists
Czech bandleaders
21st-century Czech male singers
Deaths from the COVID-19 pandemic in the Czech Republic
Deaths from pancreatic cancer
Deaths from cancer in the Czech Republic
Male journalists
20th-century journalists
People from Frýdek-Místek District